Archduke Mountain is a  mountain summit located in the Purcell Mountains of British Columbia, Canada. The nearest peak is Emperor Peak,  to the west. These two peaks make up the double summit of the Archduke-Emperor massif. The mountain's name was officially adopted June 20, 1972, when approved by the Geographical Names Board of Canada. The mountain's name was submitted by climber Dr. Curt Wagner for Beethoven's Archduke Trio, which was dedicated to Archduke Rudolf of Austria.

Climate

Based on the Köppen climate classification, Archduke Mountain is located in a subarctic climate zone with cold, snowy winters, and mild summers. Temperatures can drop below −20 °C with wind chill factors  below −30 °C. Precipitation runoff from the mountain and meltwater from its glaciers drains into tributaries of the Duncan River.

See also

Geography of British Columbia

References

External links
 Weather: Archduke Mountain

Three-thousanders of British Columbia
Purcell Mountains
Kootenay Land District